EGTK can refer to:
 London Oxford Airport, whose ICAO airport code is EGTK
 Ejército Guerrillero Tupac Katari -- an indigenous guerrilla movement in Bolivia